The 1984 Mr. Olympia contest was an IFBB professional bodybuilding competition held in October 1984 at the Felt Forum in New York City, New York.

Results

Total prize money awarded was $100,000.

Notable events

Lee Haney won his first Mr. Olympia title
the event had the highest attendance for the prejudging (4,200) and finals (5,000)  and the largest amount of total prize money ($100,000) for any Olympia up to that time

References

External links 
 Mr. Olympia

 1984
1984 in American sports
1984 in bodybuilding